Journal of Zoological Systematics and Evolutionary Research is a quarterly, peer reviewed, scientific journal, published by Wiley-Blackwell. It was originally established in 1963, then reestablished in 1994 by John Wiley & Sons (some division of Blackwell). The editor in chief is Dr. Wilfried Westheide (Germany).  According to Journal Citation Reports, the 2016 impact factor for this journal is 2.444.

Scope
The focus of Journal of Zoological Systematics and Evolutionary Research is the systematic study of animal sciences, connected with evolutionary research. Its function is both as a forum and a survey for the range of evolutionary research studies and related fields, which is published in English, German or French. A component of the focus is integrating original research results from anatomy, morphology, physiology, ethology, general genetics, population genetics, developmental biology,  and molecular biology. Besides original research articles (20 pages), this journal also publishes review articles, short communications, and letters to the editors. As a forum for discourse and the exchange of science,  authors are encouraged to send in criticisms of previously published articles.

Historical background

Abstracting and indexing
Journal of Zoological Systematics and Evolutionary Research is indexed in the following databases: 
 AGRICOLA Database (National Agricultural Library)
 EBSCO : Academic Search, Current Abstracts, Academic Search Premier
 Elsevier : BIOBASE, Embiology, GEOBASE / Geographical & Geological Abstracts,  Protozoological Abstracts, SCOPUS
 CSA Illumina : ASFA / Aquatic Sciences & Fisheries Abstracts, Biological Sciences Database, Environmental Sciences & Pollution Management Database, Human Population & Natural Resource Management
 CABI : Global Health, CAB Direct, Index Veterinarius
 Web of Knowledge : Current Contents / Agriculture, Biology & Environmental Sciences, Biological Abstracts, BIOSIS Previews, Journal Citation Reports, SciSearch, Science Citation Index, Zoological Record

References

Quarterly journals
Zoology journals
Evolutionary biology journals
Publications established in 1963
Wiley-Blackwell academic journals
English-language journals